Edwin "Ted" Thorpe (born 1898, date of death unknown) was an English professional footballer.

Career
Thorpe started his career with Sheffield Wednesday during the First World War. He then joined Lincoln City in June 1919, where he played for two seasons. He made 12 league appearances for the club and joined Doncaster Rovers in July 1921, playing for them for one season before joining York City for their first season in the Midland League in August 1922. He missed just one game during this season, proving to be solid and consistent. After making 41 appearances that season, he joined Reading in August 1923, where he made three league appearances.

References

1898 births
People from Kiveton Park
Year of death missing
English footballers
Association football fullbacks
Kiveton Park F.C. players
Sheffield Wednesday F.C. players
Lincoln City F.C. players
Doncaster Rovers F.C. players
York City F.C. players
Reading F.C. players
English Football League players
Midland Football League players